Wiley "Chip" Edward Price IV (born April 27, 1984) is a Democratic member of the Missouri General Assembly representing the State's 84th House district.

Career
Wiley Price, a marketing director, was elected unopposed in 2018 and 2020. However, he's not just that. He was a rapper in the 2000's, not widely known, but preforming in different places around St.Louis MO. His home town.

Sexual misconduct allegations and censure 
Price was accused of having a sexual relationship with a House intern, a violation of House ethics policy, and threatening his legislative assistant when she reported it to House staff. The House Ethics Committee found that Price committed perjury in his testimony to the committee, obstructed with the committee investigation, and retaliated against his assistant.

On January 13, 2021, the House of Representatives formally censured Price by a vote of 140-3. An amendment to expel Price failed to receive the required two-third majority. As a consequence of censure, Price was removed from all committee assignments, prevented from holding leadership positions, and banned from directly supervising staff or interns. Price was later expelled from the House Democratic Caucus.

References

Price, Wiley
Living people
21st-century American politicians
1984 births